The Phoenix Hill Tavern was a live music venue located in Phoenix Hill, Louisville, Kentucky. It won LEO Weekly "Best of Louisville" award for eight consecutive years. Opened in 1976, the club closed in 2015, and was demolished in 2017. The tavern began as one room in a rundown warehouse, eventually expanding to 25,000-square-foot facility. Phoenix Hill Tavern hosted famous artists from many different genres, including Meat Loaf, Miley Cyrus, Blues Traveler, Foghat, Tori Amos, Kansas and Blue Öyster Cult.

References

Music venues in Kentucky
1976 establishments in Kentucky
2015 disestablishments in Kentucky
Demolished buildings and structures in Kentucky
Buildings and structures demolished in 2017
Drinking establishments in Kentucky